The 8th season of Taniec z Gwiazdami, the Polish edition of Dancing With the Stars, started on 7 September 2008 and ended on 30 November 2008. It was broadcast by TVN. Katarzyna Skrzynecka and Piotr Gąsowski continued as the hosts, and the judges were: Iwona Szymańska-Pavlović, Zbigniew Wodecki, Beata Tyszkiewicz and Piotr Galiński.

Couples

Scores

Red numbers indicate the lowest score for each week.
Green numbers indicate the highest score for each week.
 indicates the couple eliminated that week.
 indicates the returning couple that finished in the bottom two.
 indicates the winning couple of the week.
 indicates the runner-up of the week.
 indicates the third place couple of the week.

Notes:

Special Star

Average Chart

Average Dance Chart

Highest and lowest scoring performances
The best and worst performances in each dance according to the judges' marks are as follows:

The Best Score (40)

Episodes
Individual judges scores in charts below (given in parentheses) are listed in this order from left to right: Iwona Szymańska-Pavlović, Zbigniew Wodecki, Beata Tyszkiewicz and Piotr Galiński.

Week 1
Running order

Week 2

Running order

Week 3

Running order

Week 4

Running order

Week 5

Running order

Week 6

Running order

Week 7: ABBA Week

Running order

Week 8: Spanish Week
Running order

Week 9: Disney's Fairytales Themes Week

Running order

Week 10: Polish Week

Running order

Week 11

Running order

Week 12

Running order

Week 13: Final

Running order

Other Dances

Dance Schedule
The celebrities and professional partners danced one of these routines for each corresponding week.
 Week 1: Cha-Cha-Cha or Waltz (Men) & Group Salsa (Women)
 Week 2: Rumba or Quickstep (Women) & Group Swing (Men)
 Week 3: Jive or Tango
 Week 4: Paso Doble or Foxtrot
 Week 5: Salsa or Viennese Waltz
 Week 6: Samba or American Smooth
 Week 7: One unlearned dance (ABBA Week)
 Week 8: One unlearned dance & Group Mambo (Latin Dance Week)
 Week 9: One unlearned dance & Group Viennese Waltz (Walt Disney Movies Week)
 Week 10: One unlearned & one repeated dance (Polish Week)  Natalia & Łukasz: One unlearned Latin dance & One unlearned Ballroom dance
 Week 11: One unlearned & one repeated dance
 Week 12: Argentine Tango & one repeated Latin dance
 Week 13: Favorite Latin dance, favorite Ballroom dance & Freestyle

Dance Chart

 Highest scoring dance
 Lowest scoring dance
 Performed, but not scored

Weekly results
The order is based on the judges' scores combined with the viewers' votes.

 This couple came in first place with the judges.
 This couple came in first place with the judges and gained the highest number of viewers' votes.
 This couple gained the highest number of viewers' votes.
 This couple came in last place with the judges and gained the highest number of viewers' votes.
 This couple came in last place with the judges.
 This couple came in last place with the judges and was eliminated.
 This couple was eliminated.
 This couple won the competition.
 This couple came in second in the competition.
 This couple came in third in the competition.

Audience voting results
The percentage of votes cast by a couple in a particular week is given in parentheses.

Rating Figures

References

External links
 Official Site - Taniec z gwiazdami
 Taniec z gwiazdami on Polish Wikipedia

Season 08
2008 Polish television seasons